"Je Crois" (I believe) is a song performed by Belgian singer of Italian origin Roberto Bellarosa, released as the second single from his debut studio album Ma voie (2012). It was released on July 6, 2012 as a digital download in Belgium on iTunes. The song was written by Quentin Mosimann, Thierry Leteurtre, Maud Brooke and produced by Tiery-F.

Music video
A music video to accompany the release of "Je Crois" was first released onto YouTube on July 27, 2012 at a total length of two minutes and fifty-seven seconds.

Track listing

Credits and personnel
 Lead vocals – Roberto Bellarosa
 Producers – Tiery-F
 Lyrics – Quentin Mosimann, Thierry Leteurtre, Maud Brooke
 Label – SME Belgium NV, 8ball Music

Chart performance

Release history

References

2012 singles
Roberto Bellarosa songs
2012 songs
Sony Music singles